= Gerald Jatzek =

Austrian author, composer, mail artist and musician

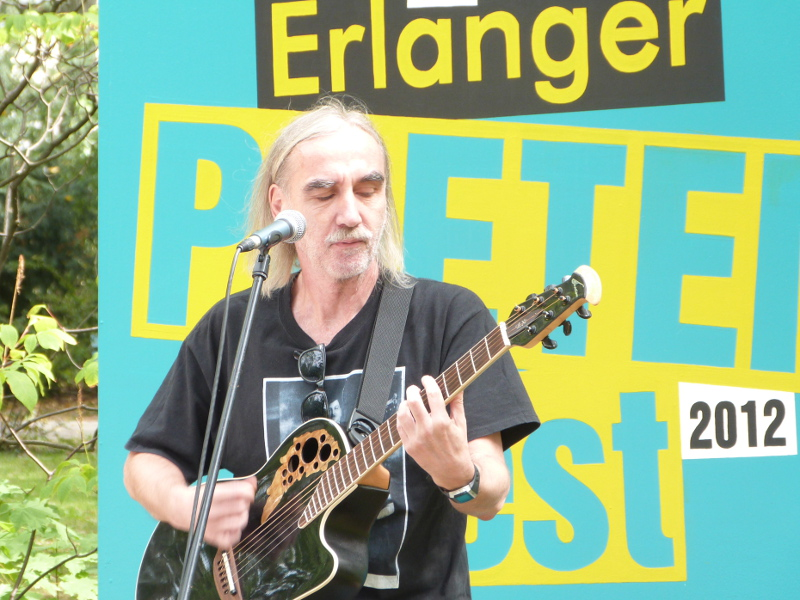
Gerald Jatzek at the Erlanger Poetenfest 2012

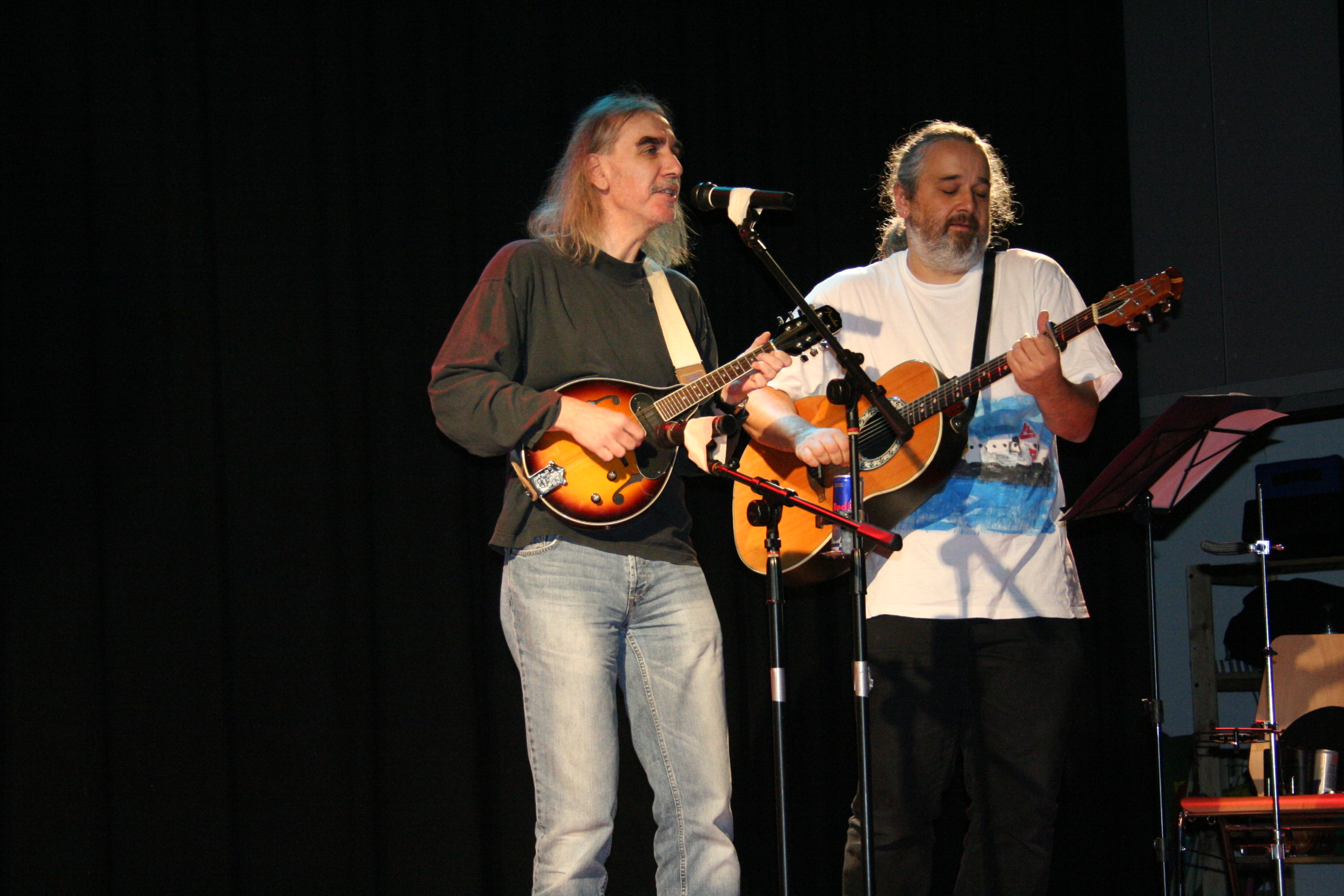
Gerald Jatzek (mandolin) and Christian Orou (guitar), 2007 onstage in Vienna

Gerald Jatzek (born 23 January 1956 in Vienna) is an Austrian author, composer, mail artist and musician. He writes in German and English and has published books for children and adults, short stories, plays for radio, and essays. His books have been translated into Korean and Turkish, his poems have appeared in anthologies and literature papers in Germany, Switzerland, Liechtenstein, Italy, Slovakia, the Czech Republic, Croatia, the Netherlands, the UK, and the USA.

1980 he was awarded the Liechtenstein Price. 2001 he got the Austrian State Prize for Children's Poetry.

== Books ==
- Der Lixelhix children's book, 1986
- Gegentöne - Kritische Lieder, rebellischer Rock, nonfiction, with Philipp Maurer, ÖGB-Verlag Vienna 1988
- Der Tag des Riesen, Picture Book Text, graphic: Annegert Fuchshuber, Ellermann Verlag, Munic 1989 ISBN 3-7707-6298-3
- Widerrede - Die Kabarettung Österreichs, nonfiction, with Philipp Maurer, ÖGB-Verlag, Vienna 1990
- Dina und der Zauberzwerg, children's book, Jungbrunnen Verlag, Vienna 1990, ISBN 3-7026-5631-6
- Der freche Pelikan, Picture Book Text, graphic: Ursula Kirchberg, Ellermann Verlag, Munic 1991, ISBN 3-7707-6317-3
- Isidor, der kleine Drache, Picture Book Text, graphic: Rosemarie P. Sohn, Ellermann Verlag, Munic 1991, ISBN 3-7707-6326-2
- Mein Freund, der Riesenriese, children's book, Neuer Breitschopf Verlag, Vienna 1992, ISBN 3-7004-0172-8
- Ich bin, wer ich will! children's book, with Christian Orou, Neuer Breitschopf Verlag, Wien 1992, ISBN 3-7004-0192-2
- Freddie Flink in Schilda, children's book, with Beppo Beyerl, Neuer Breitschopf Verlag, Wien 1993, ISBN 3-7004-1186-3
- Der Rückwärtstiger, children's book: short stories, St. Gabriel, Mödling 1995, ISBN 3-85264-476-3 (Paperback: dtv 1998)
- Wienerisch - das andere Deutsch, with Beppo Beyerl and Klaus Hirtner, Rump Verlag, Lingen/Ems 1995, ISBN 3-89416-269-4
- Kuno, das Schulgespenst, children's book, 1996; new edition: Obelisk Verlag, Innsbruck 2018, ISBN 978-3-85197-926-8
- Kuno aus der Tasche, children's book: Erzählung plus Rätsel, Noten und Basteltipps, Gabriel, Vienna 1998, ISBN 3-7072-6575-7
- Lexikon der nervigsten Dinge und ätzendsten Typen. Satires, with Beppo Beyerl, Munic 1998
- Valentin und Wanda, children's book, with Beppo Beyerl, Residenz Verlag, St. Pölten 2003
- Wie kommt der Esel auf die Brücke, nonfiction, with Hermann Schlösser, Molden Verlag, Vienna 2008, ISBN 978-3-85485-211-7
- Die rote Gitarre, children's book, illustrated by Moidi Kretschmann, G&G-Verlag, Vienna 2010, ISBN 978-3-7074-1180-5.
- Der Hase hüpft in hübschen Hosen, children's book with Audio-CD, illustrated by Lisa Manneh, G&G-Verlag, Vienna 2010, ISBN 978-3-7074-1226-0.
- Rabauken-Reime, poetrybook, illustrated by Andrea Steffen, Residenz Verlag, St. Pölten 2011, ISBN 978-3-7017-2079-8.
- Der Schnüffelbold, children's book, Obelisk-Verlag, Innsbruck 2012, ISBN 978-3-85197-668-7
- Der Hund ist tot. Grätzelgeschichten aus 24 Wiener Bezirken, with Beppo Beyerl and Manfred Chobot, Löcker Verlag, Vienna 2012, ISBN 978-3-85409-617-7
- Die Lieder riechen nach Thymian. Reisegedichte von Afghanistan bis Zypern (poetry)', Verlag Berger, Horn 2014, ISBN 978-3-85028-621-3
- Podium Porträt, poetrybook, Podium, Neulengbach and Vienna 2017, ISBN 978-3-902886-35-4

== Songs ==
- (with Claudia Hainschink:) Das Lied hinter dem Lied. Dialektgedichte und Chansontexte. Cassette, IDI, Vienna 1979

=== with Thomas Raber ===
- Der Tiger und der Jäger, Zeit, Ein Kind ist keine Maschine on the CD "Liederfundkiste - Juchhe der erste Schnee", RATOM-Edition, Vienna 2011
- Abrakadabra, Hänsel und Gretel auf dem Klo on the CD "Liederfundkiste - In Kinderstadt", RATOM-Edition, Vienna 2012
- Tsching Tschang Tschungon the CD "Liederfundkiste - Eine Schule für Coole", RATOM-Edition, Vienna 2012

== Editorship ==
- Gedichte nach 1984. Poetry from Austria, by Gerald Jatzek and Hansjörg Zauner, Edition Ahnungen, Vienna 1985, ISBN 3-900577-01-3
- Erleichterung beim Zungezeigen. Poetry against frustration, by Gerald Jatzek and Manfred Chobot, Verlag Jugend & Volk, Vienna 1989, ISBN 3-224-11446-0
- Ich denk, ich denk, was du nicht denkst. Anthology for children, Neuer Breitschopf Verlag, Vienna 1991, ISBN 3-7004-0157-4
- Wenn ich zaubern könnte! Anthology for children, Neuer Breitschopf Verlag, Vienna 1993
- Schmäh ohne, aber echt, Wiener Satire und Humor aus 100 Jahren, by Gerald Jatzek and Manfred Chobot, Edition Mokka, Vienna 2011, ISBN 978-3-902693-27-3
